Charles Dowdall (7 April 1898 – 7 November 1987) was an Irish footballer. He played for several clubs in both the League of Ireland and the English League and was also capped at international level by Ireland. He was born in Dublin.

Club career
In 1922 Dowdall was a member of the St James's Gate team that won the first ever League of Ireland title and the first ever FAI Cup. During the FAI Cup final against Shamrock Rovers, his skirmishes with Bob Fullam helped provoke post-match disturbances involving players and supporters. 

Together with Paddy Duncan, Thomas Murphy, Ernest MacKay and Michael Farrell, Dowdall was one of five players from St James's Gate, included in the Irish Free State squad for the 1924 Olympic Games.

After a spell with Fordsons, Dowdall played for both Barnsley and Swindon Town in the English League. He made his debut for Swindon on 1 March 1930, scoring in a 3–3 away draw with Northampton Town. However, he only made 8 league appearances for the club. He scored again, against Watford in 3–1 home defeat on 18 April, before making his final appearance on 21 April in 4–1 away defeat against the same opponents.

Irish international
Between 1924 and 1931 Dowdall made 5 appearances for the Irish Free State. Although he was included in the squad that competed at the 1924 Olympic Games he did not get a game. However, after the Irish were knocked out of the competition, they arranged to play a friendly with Estonia on 3 June at the Stade Olympique. Dowdall subsequently made his international debut in this 3–1 win.

On 14 June 1924 he also played against the United States in another 3–1 win at Dalymount Park.

In March 1926 he travelled with the Irish squad to play Italy, but once again did not play.

He did, however, play twice against Belgium in 1928 and 1929 before winning his last cap on 4 April 1931 in a 1–1 draw with Spain at the Montjuic Stadium.

Honours

 St James's Gate

League of Ireland
Winners 1921–22: 1
FAI Cup
Winners 1922: 1

References

External links
 Club stats
 Picture at www.irelandshirts.com

1898 births
Republic of Ireland association footballers
Footballers at the 1924 Summer Olympics
Olympic footballers of Ireland
Swindon Town F.C. players
Barnsley F.C. players
League of Ireland players
Fordsons F.C. players
Cork F.C. players
1987 deaths
League of Ireland XI players
St James's Gate F.C. players
Association football forwards
Irish Free State international footballers